Hampton High is a co-educational Secondary School, with a Sixth Form, in Hampton in the London Borough of Richmond upon Thames, England.  Its latest refurbishment, for £15, was completed in 2014.  The school has had three previous names and was founded in 1936.

Rebecca Poole has been the headteacher since September 2017.

Hampton High is an academy operated (substantially governed) by the Bourne Trust, a multi-academy trust which operates two other academies in the same borough: Twickenham School and Teddington School.

Performance
As with other schools, latest examination results and related data are published in the Department for Education's national tables.

History
The first school to be built on the site of Hampton High was named Rectory School, established in 1936.  It was later renamed Hampton Community College.

By 2001, the school buildings at Hampton Community College, and other local schools, were considered inadequate for a modern education system.  The school was re-built as part of the sponsored academies programme, re-opening as Hampton Academy in 2010, under the governance of the Learning Schools Trust.

The governance of Hampton Academy was transferred to the Richmond West Schools Trust in September 2016, and its name was changed to Hampton High shortly afterwards.  It then moved to the larger Bourne Trust in September 2021.

References

External links
Hampton High official website

Secondary schools in the London Borough of Richmond upon Thames
Academies in the London Borough of Richmond upon Thames
Learning Schools Trust
Hampton, London